ADP-ribosylation factor 1 is a protein that in humans is encoded by the ARF1 gene.

Function 

ADP-ribosylation factor 1 (ARF1) is a member of the human ARF gene family. The family members encode small guanine nucleotide-binding proteins that stimulate the ADP-ribosyltransferase activity of cholera toxin and play a role in vesicular trafficking as activators of phospholipase D. The gene products, including 6 ARF proteins and 11 ARF-like proteins, constitute a family of the RAS superfamily. The ARF proteins are categorized as class I (ARF1, ARF2 and ARF3), class II (ARF4 and ARF5) and class III (ARF6), and members of each class share a common gene organization. The ARF1 protein is localized to the Golgi apparatus and has a central role in intra-Golgi transport. Multiple alternatively spliced transcript variants encoding the same protein have been found for this gene.

The major mechanism of action of Brefeldin A is through inhibition of ARF1.

Interactions
ARF1 has been shown to interact with:
 CHRM3,
 COPB1, 
 GGA3, and
 PLD2.

References

Further reading

External links